Born in East L.A. is a 1987 American comedy film written and directed by Cheech Marin in his feature film directorial debut, who also starred in the film. It co-stars Paul Rodriguez, Daniel Stern, Kamala Lopez, Jan-Michael Vincent, Lupe Ontiveros and Jason Scott Lee in his first feature film debut. The film is based on his song of the same name, released as a 1985 single by Cheech & Chong. The film focuses on Rudy Robles, a Mexican-American from East Los Angeles who is mistaken for an illegal alien and deported.

Born in East L.A. marked Marin's first solo film, without the involvement of his comedy partner, Tommy Chong, at the insistence of executive Frank Price, who was fired between greenlighting and production due to the failure of Howard the Duck. Born in East L.A. was ultimately a financial success, and bolstered Marin's reputation in the Latino community, winning several awards at the Havana Film Festival.

Plot
Rudy Robles (Cheech Marin) is told by his mother to pick up his cousin Javier (Paul Rodriguez) at a factory in Downtown Los Angeles before she and his sister leave for Fresno. Robles arrives shortly before immigration officials raid the factory looking for illegal immigrants. Because he is carrying no identification, and his mother and sister are not available to verify he is a US citizen, Robles is deported with the undocumented immigrants to Mexico.

Robles cannot speak more than very simple Spanglish, though he is fluent in German from having served in Germany in the United States Army.

In Tijuana, Robles becomes friends with a guy named Jimmy (Daniel Stern) and a waitress named Dolores (Kamala Lopez-Dawson). Unable to contact his mother, Robles makes repeated attempts to cross the border, all ending in failure.

Jimmy offers to get him back home for a price. Having left home without his wallet, Robles works for Jimmy as doorman at a strip club, earning extra money selling oranges and teaching five would be illegal immigrants, two Nahuatl natives (Del Zamora and Sal López) and three Asians (Jason Scott Lee, Ted Lin and Jee Teo), to walk and talk like East Los Angeles natives. They become called the "Waas Sappening Boys" or "What's Happening Boys".

Robles falls in love with Dolores and finally raises the money needed to be smuggled across the border. He goes on a date with Dolores and the next day, Robles bids farewell to Jimmy, receives a last kiss goodbye from Dolores and climbs into the coyote's truck. He sees a woman pleading to also be taken as her husband is already in the truck and their family is in the United States, but she lacks the money to pay for her to be smuggled. Robles gives the woman his place.

Robles stands for the last time on the hill of the Mexico–United States border while two immigration officers sit in their truck watching in laughter. The song "America" by Neil Diamond is heard as Robles raises his arms and hundreds of people appear and race forward to reach the American Dream. The immigration officers hide in their truck. Rudy, Dolores, and their "Waas Up" friends walk with their heads up high into the United States.

Rudy and Dolores are kidnapped by coyotes and held for ransom, coincidentally, across the street from Rudy's home. He calls his cousin Javier from across the street to bring him his wallet, which he does to pay off the kidnappers. Then la migra storms in, headed by the man in the sunglasses and cowboy hat who had deported Rudy in the beginning.

Rudy shows his identification this time to the immigration officer, who says he's going to send Dolores back to El Salvador. Rudy and Dolores make a dash and escape during the East Los Angeles Cinco de Mayo parade. Not knowing where to turn, Rudy and Dolores hop onto the float with a priest; Rudy asks if he can marry them. Rudy and Dolores both look at each other in happiness as they are wed.

The immigration officer arrives to place Dolores under arrest. Rudy then explains that they've just been married, making Dolores a legal resident. The crowd, witnessing everything, cheers.

Cast

 Cheech Marin as Rudy Robles
 Paul Rodriguez as Javier
 Daniel Stern as Jimmy
 Kamala Lopez as Dolores
 Jan-Michael Vincent as McCalister
 Lupe Ontiveros as Mrs. Robles
 Alma Martinez as Gloria

 Neith Hunter as Marcie (the Redhead)
 Larry Blackmon as Slick dude
 Tito Larriva as Oscar
 Terrence Evans as Immigration Officer
 Tony Plana as Feo
 Eddie Barth as Lester
 Del Zamora as What’s Happening Boys
 Jason Scott Lee as What’s Happening Boys

Production
Following the success of Cheech & Chong's 1985 single "Born in East L.A.", a parody of Bruce Springsteen's "Born in the U.S.A." written by Cheech Marin, Frank Price, at the time a development executive at Universal Pictures, called Marin, whom he had known from having previously worked at Columbia Pictures, where Cheech & Chong had made the films Nice Dreams and Things Are Tough All Over. Price suggested that the song would make a good film, but without Tommy Chong's involvement. With the deterioration of Marin's comedy partnership with Chong, Marin signed a contract with Universal to write, direct and star in Born in East L.A.

Production commenced in Tijuana, Mexico, where the crew faced difficulty filming from the Mexican government. Actor Tony Plana (Feo) described Cheech Marin as a collaborative director, saying, "He was open to ideas, and finding the socially relevant insight into what we were doing, as well as finding the comedy." Marin and Plana worked together on developing the character, with Plana stating, "At the time, we had a couple of religious scandals going on, such as Jim Bakker and Jimmy Swaggart — preachers who sinned publicly. We wanted to satirize them a little bit. We turned Feo into a guy who extorts money in the name of Jesus." Plana also improvised much of his dialogue, including "You don’t have to thank me, you just have to pay me."

Also improvised was the scene with Marin standing outside the bar; the people that walked past him, Marin claims, were not extras, and their reactions were real.

During shooting, the film's producer, Peter MacGregor-Scott, was interviewed by a Mexican radio station, where he called for extras to come to the set to appear in the movie, where they would receive American scale pay, lunch and transportation paid for by the production.

Release
Between the greenlighting and production of Born in East L.A., Frank Price was fired by Universal due to the failure of Howard the Duck, which was blamed on Price. As a result of Price's departure from the studio, Universal chose to spend little money publicizing Born in East L.A., as Price was the only executive who supported the project.

Ultimately, according to Marin, the film was the second-highest grossing release in its opening week. The film also increased Marin's popularity among the Latino community. However, the movie dropped by 40% in its second week at the box office. Still, Born in East L.A. proved to be a financial success. During release, Marin traveled to Havana, Cuba to present the film as an official entry at the Havana Film Festival.

According to Marin, he also received praise from Richard Pryor, who Marin says left him a phone message stating, "I went in not expecting much and was blown away. You made a great film. You should be proud."

Critical response
Kevin Thomas of the Los Angeles Times wrote, "Born in East L.A. is an across-the-board winner" and said that it had "more energy and drive" than La Bamba.

More negative response, however, came from critic Richard Harrington of The Washington Post, who wrote:

Caryn James, film critic for The New York Times, wrote:

Accolades
Wins
 Havana Film Festival: Winner, Best Production Design & Best Screenplay; 1987.
 Havana Film Festival: 3rd Place, Grand Coral Prize, Cheech Marin; 1987.

Home video releases and alterations
An extended version of the film was produced for television, containing a longer, alternate ending.

The movie was released in VHS and DVD format. Shout Factory released it on Blu-ray under their Shout Select banner on March 19, 2019. The Blu-ray edition included  new interviews with Cheech Marin, Paul Rodriguez and Kamala Lopez, an audio commentary by Marin, the trailer, the theatrical cut in high definition and the extended television version in standard definition and in 4:3 (1.33:1) aspect ratio, although High Def Digest reported that the television cut was presented in widescreen at 1.85:1.

References

External links

 
 
 
 
 

1987 films
1987 comedy films
American comedy films
Films based on songs
Films set in Los Angeles
Films set in Tijuana
Films about Mexican Americans
Universal Pictures films
Films scored by Lee Holdridge
1987 directorial debut films
Films produced by Peter MacGregor-Scott
1980s English-language films
1980s American films
1980s Mexican films